Trimester or Trimestre may refer to:
 Academic term, a trimester system divides the academic year into three terms
 Trimester (pregnancy) in humans, where the time of pregnancy is divided into three terms of 13 weeks to refer to the fetus's development
 The trimester framework in Roe v. Wade, which organized constitutional issues in abortion law according to trimesters
 A period of three months (Latin tri +mensis=month or moon) In Europe, where financial years start on 1 January each year, often Jan+Feb+Mar etc.

See also
Semester
Term (disambiguation)

Units of time